No Baggage is the second and final solo album from Dolores O'Riordan. It was released on 21 August 2009 in Ireland, most of the world on 24 August 2009 and on 25 August 2009 in North America. The first single, "The Journey" was released to radio on 13 July in North America and on 10 August in Europe.

It includes a new version of "Apple of My Eye", a song featured on O'Riordan's debut solo album, Are You Listening?.

On the week beginning 27 August 2009 No Baggage entered the Irish Albums Chart at number 80. In 2010 it was awarded a silver certification from the Independent Music Companies Association, which indicated sales of at least 30,000 copies throughout Europe.

Producer Dan Brodbeck won the 2010 Juno Award for Recording Engineer of the Year for his work on the songs "Apple of My Eye" and "Be Careful" from No Baggage.
The second single is "Switch Off the Moment". The music video for "The Journey" was filmed in 16 mm, at Howth Beach Pier and Howth Summit, Dublin, Ireland, on 8 May 2009. The music video aired on 29 July 2009.

Critical reception
No Baggage received mixed or average reviews upon its release, receiving a 45/100 critic score on Metacritic. Some critics found merit in the record, with Sputnikmusic noting that it shows O'Riordan "building on old strengths, while broadening her artistic scope farther than it's been in thirteen years".

The majority of critics, however, dismissed the record. The Boston Globe remarked that the album "is undone by a batch of not-so-great songs. [O'Riordan] wallows in more melodrama than might be expected, while trying to be self-consciously profound," while Uncut magazine simply commented, "It's grisly."

Sarah Moore from PopMatters stated that "she gives her yodels a certain sheen, and combined with the background vocals they sort of gloss across the refrains".

AllMusic's Stephen Thomas Erlewine gave the album a three-and-a-half-out-of-five-stars, exclaiming that,

Track listing
Finalized track list as revealed on O'Riordan's official website:

Band members
Dolores O’Riordan – vocals, piano
Dan Brodbeck – guitar; bass on "The Journey"
Marco Mendoza – bass except on "The Journey"
Denny DeMarchi – piano
Ger Farrell – drums except on "Stupid"
Steve DeMarchi – guitar on "Stupid"
Corey Thompson – drums on "Stupid", percussion on "Throw Your Arms Around Me"
Matt Grady – digeridoo

Charts

References

Dolores O'Riordan albums
2009 albums
Cooking Vinyl albums
Rounder Records albums
Zoë Records albums